Kuvaja is a Finnish-language surname. Notable people with the surname include:

 Eino Kuvaja (1906–1975), Finnish Major and skier
 Jukka Kuvaja (born 1953), Finnish skier
 Pekka Kuvaja (1921–2003), Finnish cross country skier
 Chloe Kuvaja (born 2002), American Aquaculturist

Finnish-language surnames